Ceylonthelphusa rugosa is a species of decapod in the family Gecarcinucidae.

The IUCN conservation status of Ceylonthelphusa rugosa is "LC", least concern, with no immediate threat to the species' survival. The population is stable. The IUCN status was reviewed in 2008.

References

Further reading

 

Ceylonthelphusa
Articles created by Qbugbot
Crustaceans described in 1880